= Odell's Nightclub =

Defunct disco club in Baltimore, Maryland, US

Odell's Nightclub was a disco club in Baltimore opened by Odell Brock in 1976, until its cessation in 1992, located at 21 E. North Avenue. Odell's was very popular during its beginning, however its popularity was short lived, and in 1984, Odell Brock sold the club. The club would continue to be bought and sold by multiple other proprietors, such as Philip A. Murray in 1985, and Milton Tillman Jr. in 1989. Only 16 years after its initial opening, Odell's Nightclub was officially shut down in 1992 due to complaints of noise and violence.

After Brock's death in 1985, the nightclub's popularity started to drop as problems arose with the club's change in ownership. Odell's was well known for being the spot where many teenagers and young adults were able to let loose and be themselves. "Odell's was hugely popular and is still revered by some as the heart of house and dance music in Baltimore in the 1980s." Being described by its regulars as a popular place for dance and music, seeing variety was not uncommon. "It was a culture and a lifestyle, and if you were a part of it then you felt like you were a part of something special. Not many clubs these days try to capture that emotional connection."

Odell's was first closed in 1987, following Murray's arrest for involvement in a heroin ring. The club re-opened under Tillman's ownership only to be shuttered again in 1992 following complaints of noise and violence surrounding the club. Tillman was later arrested on charges of bribery for attempting to sway the zoning board's position on the club.

In August 1993, the corporate owner of Odell's nightclub applied for a permit to reopen Odell's as a restaurant and banquet hall with entertainment. The club was able to remain open briefly while the zoning issues worked their way through the courts, but was forced to close permanently at the end of August 1993.

In 2012, Will Hanna entered into negotiations with the club's then owners to purchase the club with the intention of restoring it as an upscale nightclub.

== Reception ==
Despite its short lifespan, Odell's received its share of positive and negative opinions. Residents who lived in a neighborhood near Odell's blamed the club for an outbreak of crimes such as car theft, shootings and street robberies. Owner (at the time) Milton Tillman attempted to remedy these complaints, saying, "A lot of the neighborhood's problems are blamed on us... We've never had any incidents inside of Odell's, so how can they blame what happened two blocks away on the crowd that comes here? That's not fair because it's not our fault what happens away from the club."
